Guillermo is the Spanish form of the male given name William. The name is also commonly shortened to 'Guille' or, in Latin America, to nickname 'Memo'.

People
Guillermo Amor (born 1967), Spanish football manager and former player
Guillermo Arévalo (born 1952), a Shipibo shaman and curandero (healer) of the Peruvian Amazon; among the Shipibo he is known as Kestenbetsa
Guillermo Barros Schelotto (born 1973), Argentine former football player
Guillermo Bermejo (born 1975), Peruvian politician
Guillermo C. Blest (1800–1884),  Anglo-Irish physician settled in Chile
Guillermo Cañas, Argentine tennis player
Guillermo Chong, Chilean geologist
Guillermo Coria, another Argentine tennis player
Guillermo Dávila, Venezuelan actor and singer
Guillermo Díaz (actor) (born 1975), American actor of Cuban descent
Guillermo Diaz (basketball), Puerto Rican basketball player for the Los Angeles Clippers
Guillermo del Toro, Mexican filmmaker, screenwriter, producer, author, actor, former special effects artist
Guillermo Díaz (footballer, born 1979), football player
Guillermo Díaz (footballer, born 1930) (1930-1997)
Guillermo Endara (1936–2009), Panamanian President, 1989–1994
Guillermo Eleazar, Filipino police officer
Guillermo Galván Galván, Mexican Army General
Guillermo García López, Spaniard tennis player
Guillermo Rodríguez González, Spanish archer
Guillermo Lasso (born 1955), Ecuadorian businessman and President of Ecuador
Guillermo Mac Millan (born 1940/1941), retired Chilean urologist
Guillermo Marquez, one of the two baby twins of Dora in Dora the Explorer
Guillermo Morphy, Spanish aristocrat and musicologist
Guillermo Muñoz, Mexican football (soccer) player
Guillermo Ochoa, Mexican National Goalkeeper
Guillermo Rawson (1821–1890), Argentinian doctor and politician
Guillermo Rigondeaux, Cuban boxer
Guillermo Rodríguez (baseball), Venezuelan baseball catcher
Guillermo Rodríguez (footballer), Uruguayan footballer
Guillermo Rodríguez (politician), also known as Guillermo Rodríguez Lara, Ecuadorian politician
Guillermo Rodriguez (comedian), talk show sidekick for Jimmy Kimmel Live!
Guillermo Solá, Chilean distance runner
Guillermo Vilas, Argentine former tennis player
Guillermo Viviani (1893–1964), Chilean Roman Catholic priest and trade unionist
Luis Madrigal, a former athlete whose full name is Luis Guillermo Madrigal Gutiérrez

See also
 Hurricane Guillermo

Spanish masculine given names